Terminal may refer to:

Computing

Hardware
 Terminal (electronics), a device for joining electrical circuits together
 Terminal (telecommunication), a device communicating over a line
 Computer terminal, a set of primary input and output devices for a computer
 Feedback terminal, a physical device used collect anonymous feedback

Software
 Terminal emulator, a program that emulates a computer terminal within some other display architecture
 Terminal (macOS), a terminal emulator included with macOS
 Windows Terminal, a terminal emulator for Windows 10 and Windows 11
 GNOME Terminal, a Linux and BSD terminal emulator
 Terminal and nonterminal symbols, lexical elements used in specifying the production rules constituting a formal grammar in computer science.

Fonts
 Terminal (typeface), a monospace font
 Terminal (typography), a type of stroke ending

Transportation
 Airport terminal, a building where passengers embark and disembark aircraft (or cargo is loaded)
 Bus station
 Battery terminal, electrical contact used to connect a load or charger to a single cell or multiple-cell battery
 Passenger terminal (maritime), a structure where passenger water vessels ships pick up and drop off passengers
 Container port, also called a terminal, where cargo containers are transferred between different vehicles or ships
 Railroad terminal, the end point of a railroad line

Places
 Terminal (Asunción), a neighbourhood in Paraguay
 Terminal Peak, a mountain in Tasmania, Australia
 Terminal Range, a mountain range in Canada

Media

Film and TV
 The Terminal, 2004 American comedy-drama film
 Terminal (2018 film), an American film starring Margot Robbie
 "Terminal", an episode of Law & Order
 "Terminal" (Space Ghost Coast to Coast), a television episode

Music
 Terminal (American band), a rock band from Texas
 terminal (Danish band), a pop rock band from Copenhagen
 Terminal (Ancestral Legacy album), 2014
 Terminal (Salyu album), 2007
 "Terminal" (Ayumi Hamasaki song), 2014
 "Terminal" (Rupert Holmes song), 1974
 "Terminals", a song by Relient K featuring Adam Young

Literature
 Terminal (Cook novel), by Robin Cook
 Terminal (Tunnels novel), a 2013 novel in the Tunnels series
 Terminal, a novel by Colin Forbes
 The Terminal Man, 1972 novel by Michael Crichton
The Terminal Man (film), film adaptation by Mike Hodges
 The Terminal Man, autobiography of Mehran Karimi Nasseri

Other uses
 Terminal illness, a progressive disease that is expected to cause death
 Terminal velocity, in physics
 Terminal High Altitude Area Defense, an American anti-ballistic missile defence system
 Terminal deoxynucleotidyl transferase, a specialized DNA polymerase
 Terminal sedation, another name for palliative sedation, the practice of inducing unconsciousness in a terminally ill person for the remainder of the person's life
 Terminal, relating to the location of a flower or other feature in botany
 Potsdam Conference, code-named “Terminal”, the last Allied meeting of World War II
 Suffix, in grammar

See also

 Termination (disambiguation) 
 Terminator (disambiguation) 
 Terminus (disambiguation) 
 Termini (disambiguation)
 Terminate (disambiguation)